Dawn Amano Ige (born March 30, 1958) is an American educator who was the first lady of Hawaii as the wife of governor David Ige.

Early life and education
Ige (née Amano) graduated from James Campbell High School. She earned her bachelor's degree in journalism from the University of Hawaii at Manoa and master's in business administration from Chaminade University of Honolulu.

Career
Prior to serving as First Lady of Hawaii, Ige was a vice principal at Kanoelani Elementary School in Waipahu, Hawaii. Before pursuing elementary education, Ige worked as a marketing director for Kapiolani Health Care Systems and a public relations account executive.

References

Living people
First Ladies and Gentlemen of Hawaii
American educators of Japanese descent
1958 births
21st-century American women